Indian Creek is a stream in Ste. Genevieve County in the U.S. state of Missouri. It is a tributary of Establishment Creek.

Indian Creek was named for the fact Indians settled near its course.

See also
List of rivers of Missouri

References

Rivers of Ste. Genevieve County, Missouri
Rivers of Missouri